born  on 31 March 1936 in Osaka, Japan) is a Japanese actor. He portrayed the role of Daisuke Arashi in the original Ultraman series (1966-1967) and Shigeru Furuhashi in Ultra Seven. He has been a radio personality on the Tokyo Broadcasting System (TBS) from October 6, 1969 to the present. His radio program is famous for vulgar language and is popular with an older audience.

Filmography

References

External links

Profile at JMDb (in Japanese)
mamuchan's room (Japanese only)
 

1936 births
Living people
Japanese male actors